Charlie Chan (born 2 January 1966; they/them) is an Australian pianist, composer and digital innovator best known for their original, mostly instrumental music albums and for creating numerous soundtracks for the stage and screen.

Having studied piano, guitar, double bass, orchestration and computer-based music technology in their childhood, Chan's public career began in the 1990s with a series of original jazz, classical, improvisation and world-music inspired albums on the Sony Masterworks classical label. At this time, they gained a reputation for blending acoustic and electronic music. Throughout their career they have been a pioneer of multimedia and digital technology to create, promote and distribute their work.

Chan is co-founder and artistic director of the Global Orchestra. Founded in 2013, the Global Orchestra connects musicians from around the world, with the ambitious vision to use music as an agent for social and environmental change. Utilising state-of-the-art technology, its Concerts for the Planet have involved thousands of musicians in more than 350 locations globally.

They are also the creator of Museful Live, providing broadcast-quality weekly music meditations on their social media channels, and promoting music, meditation and mindfulness as a pathway to well-being.  

Throughout their prolific career, Chan has been commissioned to compose soundtracks for feature films, television series, documentaries and stage productions. Highlights include soundtracks for feature film Me Myself I, long-running television drama McLeod's Daughters, and the 2011 Australian television crime-drama series Killing Time starring David Wenham.

Chan composes on their primary instrument – a 97-key Bosendorfer Imperial Grand 290 piano – and records in their HD 3 studio, combining state-of-the-art technology with collectable vintage microphones and recording equipment.

They were awarded Best Music Performance at the Melbourne Fringe Festival in 1997, and have also been nominated for two APRA (Australian Performing Rights Assoc.) Awards for Best Music for a Television Series and Best Film Score. they has also received three AGSC (Australian Guild of Screen Composers) nominations for Best Soundtrack Album, Best Music for a Feature Film, and Best Music for a Documentary.

Chan's live concert appearances include the State Theatre Sydney and Melbourne Town Hall. they performed at the Sydney Opera House in the mid-1990s for the first online live broadcast of the Sydney Gay and Lesbian Mardi Gras annual event launch. In November 2019 Chan performed at the United Nations General Assembly in New York, as part of the UNICEF summit held on World Children's Day to commemorate the 30th anniversary of the Convention on the Rights of the Child. Together with PS22 Chorus, a 60-strong children's choir from Staten Island, Chan performed their original song We The Children inspired by Damon Gameau's climate change documentary 2040.

Early years and musical influences 
The child of a Chinese-Malay father and Scottish-Australian mother, Chan was born and raised in Melbourne, Australia and grew up in the Dandenong area,  from the city's centre. they received a ukulele at age three which they took to immediately – a gift from their father's employer, GM Holden, given to Charlie at the annual company Christmas party. Chan's parents rewarded their musical interest with a Skylark acoustic guitar and music lessons when they turned five, and they soon began playing their uncle's pianola and the piano shortly thereafter. Chan also taught themself drums and started their first band at eight years of age with friends at their local Catholic girls' school.

At this time, influences included those from their parents' record collection – musicals such as My Fair Lady, Oklahoma! and The Sound of Music, along with pop and jazz influences like Chicago, Simon & Garfunkel, The Carpenters, flugelhorn player Chuck Mangione and the Getz/Gilberto collaboration that featured their famous rendition of "The Girl from Ipanema".

At the age of 12, Chan began work experience in a local Yamaha music store, gaining access to innovative instruments like the Yamaha CP70 electric grand piano along with drum kits and a Rhodes piano. A determined teenager by 13, they cajoled their school into buying a double bass and reached the classical training standard of Grade 7 within three years.

It was at this time that Chan's experience with music orchestration began. At the age of 14, they started work experience with Young Talent Time as a music copyist, approaching the production themself, and turning up repeatedly until they were offered an ongoing role.

Chan auditioned for and was accepted by three highly-regarded music-focused schools at age 15 – the Victorian College of the Arts, Blackburn High School and University High School – opting to attend the latter. By 15, Chan had furthered their orchestration experience by composing and/or arranging music for small ensembles of up to 15 musicians at school, along with drama and music camps. One of Chan's early major orchestration assignments at drama camp was for a stage adaptation of the novel They Shoot Horses Don't They?.

As Chan grew into adulthood, the musical influences that stayed with them included an eclectic range: from classical greats Mahler, Smetana and Wagner, through contemporary composer/artists theirbie Hancock, Brian Eno, Laurie Anderson, Ryuichi Sakamoto, Philip Glass and Keith Jarrett, to world-renowned Pakistani musician Nusrat Fateh Ali Khan and experimental pop artists like David Sylvian (and his band Japan), Grace Jones and Peter Gabriel.

Pop bands and solo albums 
Chan left Melbourne for Sydney at age 16, which led to commissioned work with drama and dance groups plus stints playing keyboards and drums with successful pop bands Electric Pandas, The Allniters and iconic women's band The Stray Dags.

These experiences culminated with the release of Chan's solo recordings and, in 1996 after the band's management was sent a Charlie Chan recording, an Australian and Asia Pacific tour supporting world music electronica band Deep Forest.

In the 1990s, Chan released three critically celebrated solo albums on their own label in partnership with the Sony Masterworks classical label and Sony Music Publishing. These were called The Adventures of Charlie Chan (1993), East and West (1996) and Wild Swans (1998). Each of Chan's recordings reflected their adventurous spirit, creating an unusual compositional blend of classical piano and minimalism, ambient soundscapes, globally inspired tribal folk music, jazz trio improvisation, and world-pop styled music.

Wild Swans achieved Gold status for CD sales and contains two collaborative tracks with ARIA Award-winning Australian singer/songwriter Monique Brumby. Chan's albums received positive media reviews. The Sydney Morning Herald wrote of The Adventures of Charlie Chan, "defies all boundaries, shatters musical categories and constantly takes the listener by surprise. ... intelligent, sensuous music for the open minded." The Sunday Telegraph described Wild Swans as a "harmonic meeting of classical music and high-tech soundscapes ... ambient yet energetic", while Sydney's Drum Media said, "organic origins of song, interaction of musicians, and cultural exploration create ... a fresh and beautiful collection of music."

Bringing two of their artists together, around this time Sony Masterworks released a recording of Charlie Chan and Australian classical guitarist Slava Grigoryan. The pair had recorded an improvised rendition of Chan's piece Paradise, the original meanwhile was used as the score for popular ABC television series Australian Story.

Chan has sold more than 75,000 physical CDs, and more than 500,000 individual track downloads to fans via their web site.

Music technology and digital innovation 
Chan has always been a digital pioneer, combining technology and creativity to produce, perform, promote and distribute their music.

Working with Yamaha as a new product demonstrator in their teens, Chan was exposed to a plethora of new music technology. they became proficient on the Yamaha DX7 – the first commercially successful digital synthesizer. they also took to the Minimoog – a monophonic analog synthesizer released in the early 1970s. This led to further experimentation with keyboards, sequencing software and electronic sampling – something Chan embraced at a very young age, and has continued to incorporate into their ongoing work with original albums as well as for stage and screen scores.

Chan was one the first musician/composers to embrace technology in their work. As noted by journalist Cal Clugston writing for Revolver magazine: "As well as being known for their forays into sampling and electronica, this cutting-edge pianist and songwriter has an association with multimedia (and) the internet."

In the early to mid 2000s, Chan expanded their own label, Martian Music, into a successful independent online music service for themself and other artists. Its Internet based sales and distribution mechanism pioneered digital downloads and music e-commerce in Australia.

Technology is also woven through Chan's work with the Global Orchestra, with conductor cam and live streaming utilised to connect musicians from multiple locations globally.  In 2017 the Global Orchestra created the Interactive Orchestra. This immersive, interactive orchestral experience, in partnership with Accenture Interactive, brought together data, artificial intelligence, music, real-time visualisations and the Adobe Experience Cloud. A world-class 40-member jazz ensemble performed on stage alongside Baxter, an AI-powered robot rescued from a production line, playing marimba.

Soundtracks and scores 
As a composer for screen and stage, Chan's myriad credits include soundtracks for drama series Killing Time (starring David Wenham) and McLeod's Daughters, feature film Me Myself I (starring Rachel Griffiths), TV documentary series Australian Story, acclaimed Sydney Theatre Company play Gift of the Gorgon and numerous free-to-air, National Geographic and Discovery Channel documentaries including Addiction, The Last Warriors, Persons of Interest and many more.

A Soundscapes feature article summarised Chan's musical career this way, stating "Charlie Chan is a refreshing change" and that they compose and improvise with "fluency and simplicity". "The wide appeal of [their] music is attested to by the amount of work Chan is ... commissioned to write and perform."

Works

Soundtracks 
 Museful Live 2021 (Web Series)
 Tales of the Unexpected (TV series) (2014)
 Love to Share Food (TV series) (2012)
 Killing Time (2011)
 Persons of Interest (TV series) (2011)
 Addiction (TV series) (2010)
 Australian Story (2006–2010)
 McLeod's Daughters (2001)
 Mystery of the Skull (Documentary) (2002)
 Bizarre Births (Documentary) (1996)
 Chinese Take Away (Documentary) (2002)
 Stings Fangs and Spines (TV series) (2000–2001)
 Starting from Zero (Documentary) (2000)
 The Last Warriors (TV series) (1999)
 Me Myself I (1998)
 Great Train Journeys (TV series) (1996) - (Great Railway Journeys (1996)??)
 Through Children's Eyes (Documentary) (1993)
 Billion Dollar Crop (Documentary) (1994)

Recordings 
 Constellation 52 Solo Piano Albums
 Music for Film Television and Dance (2010)
 Charlie Chan Christmas (2009)
 Charlie Chan Piano (2007)
 All Our Loving (1998)
 Wild Swans (1998)
 Dreamsounds (1997)
 East and West (1996)
 Paradise Remixes (1996)
 Music from the New World (1996)
 The Adventures of Charlie Chan (1993)
 A Prologue to the Adventures of ... (1993)
 Transmission (1990)
 The Selected Works of Charlie Chan (1990)

Personal life 
Charlie Chan lives and works in Sydney & Brisbane, Australia with their dog, a border collie named Salty. Outside of music, Chan has an avid interest in horology, sailing, kayaking and meditation. They also have a passion for vintage car and vintage sailboat restoration.

References

External links
 http://www.charliechan.com.au

1966 births
Australian composers
Australian women composers
Australian women musicians
Australian film score composers
Australian musicians
Australian pianists
Australian women pianists
Australian women film score composers
Living people
21st-century pianists
21st-century Australian women musicians
21st-century Australian musicians
20th-century Australian women musicians
20th-century Australian musicians
20th-century women pianists
21st-century women pianists